The Cambridge Hornets were a Senior "AAA" ice hockey team based out of Cambridge, Ontario. They played in the Ontario Hockey Association's Major League Hockey. The new Cambridge Hornets were brought into Southwestern Senior A Hockey League in 1999. They were members of the league in 2003 when it changed its name to Major League Hockey.

Original Hornets
The original Hornets team was founded in 1960 as the Galt Terriers, playing in the OHA Senior A hockey league. The Terriers won the J. Ross Robertson Cup as league champions in the 1960–61 season. The Terriers won the 1961 Allan Cup championship, concluding their first season. As the reigning Allan Cup champions, the Terriers represented Canada at the 1962 Ice Hockey World Championships finishing 2nd place, winning the silver medal. Notable players from that era include, Dave Dryden, Tod Sloan, Darryl Sly and Bill Wylie. The "Terriers" named itself had been used by teams in Galt dating back to the 1920s and 1930s, before World War II. Notable players included Larry Aurie, Clarence Boucher, John Brackenborough, Art Gauthier, Norman Himes, Carl Liscombe, Cliff McBride, Mickey Murray and Jean Pusie.

Following the 1961–62 season, the Galt Terriers were renamed the Galt Hornets. Gord Renwick served as president of the Hornets from 1966 to 1973. He was encouraged to revive the team's ownership group by close friend, and the team's previous coach Bill Wylie. In 1966, Renwick named Earl Balfour as the team's new playing coach, and signed Gary Collins. 

Two seasons later, the 1968–69 Hornets team won 52 of 67 games played. They won a second J. Ross Robertson Cup in a four-game sweep of the Barrie Flyers. In the national playoffs, Galt defeated the Gander Flyers in five games, then the Victoriaville Tigers in six games to reach the final. Galt captured the 1969 Allan Cup winning in four consecutive games over the Calgary Stampeders.

Renwick and the team executive used a share-the-wealth philosophy, where the players saw proportion of the team's profits. Galt won another Ontario championship in the 1970–71 season, with the goaltending tandem of Harold Hurley and Ken Broderick. In the playoffs, Galt defeated the Barrie Flyers, Orillia Terriers, Sault Ste. Marie, Thunder Bay Twins, and the Grand Falls-Windsor Cataracts to reach the finals. Galt captured the 1971 Allan Cup winning in four consecutive games over the same Calgary team from 1969, and played to sellout crowds at the Galt Arena Gardens. The Hornets represented Canada at the 1971 Ahearne Cup in Stockholm, finishing in third place behind teams from Russia and Sweden.

The team later changed its name to the Cambridge Hornets, when Galt was amalgamated into Cambridge.

NHL alumni
List of Galt Hornets alumni who also played in the NHL.
 Earl Balfour, Ken Broderick, Gary Collins, Mike Corbett, Dave Cressman, Norm Defelice, Dave Dryden, Cec Hoekstra, Tom McCarthy, Vic Teal

List of original era Cambridge Hornets alumni who also played in the NHL.
 John Brenneman, Dave Cressman, Bob Dupuis, Gerry Gray, Gary Kurt, Dave Tataryn, Vic Teal

Season-by-season record

Modern Hornets
The Hornets finished the 2005-06 season in third place, or so they thought.  In January 2006, they signed Chris MacKenzie a former semi-pro hockey player.  Despite the fact that the player's driver's licence and health card listed him as a resident of Toronto, he lived most of the time in Indianapolis, Indiana. Two other teams in the league appealed the usage of this player as a violation of the league's residency rule, which resulted in a series of late season victories being overturned to these teams' favour. The overturned victories resulted in a drop to fifth and last place for the Hornets. Irate, the ownership of the Hornets pulled their team from the league and filed a lawsuit for damages. The Cambridge Hornets have not stepped on the ice since.

NHL alumni
List of modern era Cambridge Hornets alumni who also played in the NHL.
 Jamie Allison, Gilbert Dionne, Todd Harvey, Steven Rice, Mike Torchia, Scott Walker, Peter Zezel

Season-by-season record
Note: GP = Games played, W = Wins, L = Losses, T = Ties, OTL = Overtime losses, SOL =  Shootout Loses*, Pts = Points, GF = Goals for, GA = Goals against

References

Ottawa Citizen - 2 Jan 1962

Ice hockey teams in Ontario
Senior ice hockey teams
Sport in Cambridge, Ontario
Defunct ice hockey teams in Canada
1960 establishments in Ontario
2006 disestablishments in Ontario
Ice hockey clubs established in 1960
Sports clubs disestablished in 2006
Ice hockey teams representing Canada internationally